Cervero is a surname. Notable people with the surname include:

Diego Cervero (born 1983), Spanish footballer
Robert Cervero (born 1951), American academic
 (born 1951), Brazilian chemical engineer